Deus caritas est (Latin: God is charity, God is love) may refer to:
1 John  (Vulgate), English translation "God is love" 
Deus caritas est, a 2006 papal encyclical by Pope Benedict XVI
"God Is Love" (song), a 1971 song by Marvin Gaye
God Is Love (album), a 2004 album by Dave Fitzgerald